Broughton Hackett is a village and civil parish in the Wychavon district of the county  of Worcestershire, England.  It is about 5 miles east of the city of Worcester, on the A422 (Worcester–Stratford road) and according to the 2001 census had a population of 173.

The village lies on the A422 road from Worcester to Alcester and alongside  the Bow Brook river. Its notable landmarks include the St Leonard's church and a large yew tree.

History

The lands came under Pershore Abbey and then under the manor of Hampton Lovett.  The village church of St. Leonard is thought to date back to the 14th century.

Amenities
The village has a pub, the March Hare Inn. The village also has Saint Leonards Church with bells dating back to the early 1300s.

Governance
The village comes under the Upton Snodsbury ward of Wychavon District Council, and the Upton Snodsbury division of Worcestershire County Council. The village is represented by the district councillor, Linda Robinson. The parliamentary constituency is Mid Worcestershire, Nigel Huddleston as the conservative MP.

References

External links
Archived parish website

Villages in Worcestershire